Aran is a rural locality (a selo) in Ikhrekskoye Rural Settlement, Rutulsky District, Republic of Dagestan, Russia. The population was 365 as of 2010. There are 2 streets.

Geography 
Aran is located 21 km northwest of Rutul (the district's administrative centre) by road. Dzhilikhur and Tsudik are the nearest rural localities.

Nationalities 
Rutul people live there.

References 

Rural localities in Rutulsky District